The 2010 United States Women's Curling Championships were held at Wings Stadium in Kalamazoo, Michigan, from March 6, 2010, to March 13, 2010. This was the 34th edition of the United States Women's Curling Championship; it was held alongside the 2010 United States Men's Curling Championship.

Teams qualified through three different methods. First, the defending champions were granted an automatic berth; however, Team McCormick elected not to compete because of the Vancouver Olympics which take place during the preceding two weeks. Next, teams traditionally compete first through regional qualifiers with the top teams advancing to the nationals and then the runners-up compete at a Nationals Playdown to determine the final spots. However, so few women's teams submitted applications to the Regional Qualifiers that all teams were directly advanced to the National Championships.

The winning team represented the United States at the 2010 Ford World Women's Curling Championship.

Teams
The teams are listed as follows:

Round robin standings

* clinched playoff berth

Tiebreakers

Tiebreaker 1
Thursday, March 11, 12:00 pm

Tiebreaker 2
Thursday, March 11, 4:00 pm

Playoffs

1 vs. 2 game
Friday, March 12, 8:00am

3 vs. 4 game
Friday, March 12, 8:00am

Semifinal
Friday, March 12, 4:00pm

Championship final
Saturday, March 13, 10:00am

Other notable participants
Other notable participants include Courtney George, Jordan Moulton, Jessica Schultz, and Ann Swisshelm.

References 

United States Women's Curling Championship, 2010
United States National Curling Championships
Women's curling competitions in the United States
2010 in American sports
2010 in sports in Michigan
Curling in Michigan